Marco Cecchinato and Matteo Donati were the defending champions but only Donati chose to defend his title, partnering Simone Bolelli. Donati lost in the first round to Nikola Milojević and Mohamed Safwat.

Denys Molchanov and Igor Zelenay won the title after defeating Ariel Behar and Máximo González 6–1, 6–2 in the final.

Seeds

Draw

References
 Main Draw

Open Città della Disfida - Doubles
2018 Doubles